Richard L. Wexelblat, aka Dick Wexelblat is an American, a former artisan woodturner, and a former computer scientist.

Early life 
Wexelblat received his BSEE, MSEE (CS), and Ph.D. (CS) from The Moore School of Electrical Engineering at the University of Pennsylvania in 6/1959, 6/1961, and 12/1965 respectively. His doctorate is believed by many and so reported by ACM to have been the first ever awarded by a formally recognized Computer Science department. (Note: not the first CS doctorate, but the first awarded by a CS department. See the note about Andy van Dam below.)  His doctoral advisor was Noah Prywes.

He left the computer field to become an artisan woodturner and has since retired from that field as well. He currently resides with his wife as a seniors facility in Coatesville PA.

Career 
He is said to be the originator of Wexelblat's scheduling algorithm: "Choose two of: good, fast, cheap." He states, "Bob Rosin said I originated this; I'm not sure. He also credited me with having been the first to refer to Occam's Razor as 'The Law of Least Astonishment'". http://www.anvari.org/fortune/Software_Engineering_Proverbs/16_wexelblats-scheduling-algorithm-choose-two-good-fast-cheap.html

Personal life 
His sons, Alan and David and his brother Paul are also computer scientists, although Paul is now mostly retired and David is now a lawyer.

Although Richard is proud of his achievements, he has two thoughts to share. Andries van Dam completed his Ph.D. in Computer Science at the Moore School only a few weeks after Richard. Andy has devoted his professional life to Computer Science and Computer Graphics. He is the one who deserves pioneer credit. Speaking of pioneers, Paul Wexelblat wrote code for the Interface Message Processor packet switching node, part of the earliest version of the Internet, and is a true Internet pioneer.

Selected publications 
 Richard L. Wexelblat (ed.): History of Programming Languages, Academic Press 1981.

References

External links
http://www.informatik.uni-trier.de/~ley/db/indices/a-tree/w/Wexelblat:Richard_L=.html

American computer scientists
Programming language researchers
Living people
Year of birth missing (living people)
University of Pennsylvania School of Engineering and Applied Science alumni